Oregon Route 282 is a state highway running from OR 281 north of Odell to OR 35 east of Odell within the U.S. state of Oregon. OR 282 is known as the Odell Highway No. 282 (see Oregon highways and routes).

OR 282 was established in 2002 as part of Oregon's project to assign route numbers to highways that previously were not assigned.

Route description
OR 282 begins at an intersection with OR 281 five miles (8 km) south of Hood River and heads south approximately 2½ miles to Odell.  At Odell, OR 282 turns east and continues approximately one mile to an intersection with OR 35 where it ends.

History
OR 282 was assigned to the Odell Highway in 2002.

Major intersections

References

 Oregon Department of Transportation, Descriptions of US and Oregon Routes, https://web.archive.org/web/20051102084300/http://www.oregon.gov/ODOT/HWY/TRAFFIC/TEOS_Publications/PDF/Descriptions_of_US_and_Oregon_Routes.pdf, page 29.
 Oregon Department of Transportation, Odell Highway No. 282, ftp://ftp.odot.state.or.us/tdb/trandata/maps/slchart_pdfs_1980_to_2002/Hwy282_1999.pdf

282
Transportation in Hood River County, Oregon